Dame Karen Elizabeth Pierce, Lady Roxburgh,  (born 23 September 1959) is a British diplomat who is currently British Ambassador to the United States at the Foreign, Commonwealth and Development Office, and was previously the Permanent Representative of the United Kingdom to the United Nations.

Education
Pierce was born in Preston, Lancashire, the granddaughter of Preston millworkers and only the second person in her family to go to university. She was educated at Penwortham Girls' High School in Lancashire and Girton College, Cambridge, where she received a Bachelor of Arts in English. In 2012 she gained an MSc degree in International Strategy and Diplomacy from the London School of Economics (LSE).

Career
Pierce joined the Foreign and Commonwealth Office (FCO) in 1981. After a period of training in Japanese, she was posted to Tokyo as a Third Secretary in 1984. In 1987, she returned to London and joined the Security Policy Department of the FCO. From 1992 to 1995, she was based in Washington, D.C., as Private Secretary to the Ambassador. She held various positions at the FCO between 1996 and 2000: Team Leader for Ukraine, Belarus and Moldova (1996 to 1997), Deputy Head Eastern Adriatic (Balkans) Department (1997 to 1999), and Head of the FCO Newsroom (1999 to 2000).

From 2006 to 2009 Pierce was the UK's Deputy Permanent Representative to the United Nations in New York. In this capacity, she acted as the President of the UN Security Council in April 2007 and in May 2008. From 2009 to 2012 she was Director, South Asia and Afghanistan at the FCO, acting as the UK Special Representative for Afghanistan and Pakistan June 2010 – June 2011.

From 2012 to 2015 Pierce was the Permanent Representative of the United Kingdom to the United Nations in Geneva, and also to other international organisations in Geneva including the World Trade Organization. From May 2015 to February 2016 she was the United Kingdom's Ambassador to the Islamic Republic of Afghanistan. Until early 2018, she served as the FCO's Director General Political.

Pierce was appointed as the UK's Permanent Representative to the UN in March 2018, the first woman to take on this role. During her time in office, Britain coordinated the Council's activities on Myanmar.

She was appointed Dame Commander of the Order of St Michael and St George (DCMG) in the 2018 Birthday Honours.

On 7 February 2020, she was named as the new ambassador of the United Kingdom to the United States and became the first woman in the post, replacing Lord Darroch of Kew.

Personal life 
Pierce is married to Sir Charles Roxburgh, a senior civil servant at HM Treasury. Together they have two sons, born 1991 and 1997.

References

External links
 PIERCE, Karen Elizabeth, (Mrs C. F. Roxburgh), Who's Who 2014, A & C Black, 2014; online edn, Oxford University Press, 2014
 Karen Pierce CMG, gov.uk
 

1959 births
21st-century diplomats
People from Preston, Lancashire
British women ambassadors
Alumni of Girton College, Cambridge
Alumni of the London School of Economics
Ambassadors of the United Kingdom to Afghanistan
Ambassadors of the United Kingdom to the United States
Dames Commander of the Order of St Michael and St George
Living people
Permanent Representatives of the United Kingdom to the United Nations
Permanent Representatives to the World Trade Organization